Eoborus fusiforme is a fossil species of air-breathing land snail, a terrestrial pulmonate gastropod mollusk in the family Strophocheilidae, from the Paleocene deposits of the Itaboraí Basin, in the state of Rio de Janeiro, Brazil.

References

Strophocheilidae
Paleocene gastropods
Molluscs of South America
Paleogene Brazil
Fossils of Brazil
Gastropods described in 2013
Fossil taxa described in 2013